Charles H. Sawyer may refer to:
Charles H. Sawyer (politician) (1840 –1908), Governor of New Hampshire
Charles Henry Sawyer (photographer) (1868–1954), American painter and photographer
Charles H. Sawyer (neuroendocrinologist) (1915-2006), American neuroendocrinologist